Thevara is a place in central Kochi in Kerala, India.

Location

Geography

Thevara is part of the mainland Kochi and marks its south-west boundary. It is connected to the water-bound West Kochi via bridges.

Thevara is a link to Thevara Ferry and Konthuruthy which links the place like Kumbalam, Nettoor, Kadavanthra to other areas of Kochi city via waterway. The major artery of Kochi city starts from Kacheripady and ends at Thevara Junction.

Thevara is the first residential area one would come across after crossing over the Venduruthy Bridge to enter Ernakulam city. It is a quiet waterfront locale, about 2.5 km from the commercial center of M. G. Road and South Railway Station. Cochin International Airport is 33 km to the north-east. Ernakulam Central Bus Station is about 3 km from Thevara. The road via Kundannoor is an easy access to Cochin bypass.

Places of interest

 Cochin Shipyard
 Sacred Heart College, Thevara
 Tomb of Mar Varghese Payyappilly Palakkappilly at Mar Yohannan Nepumsianose Syro-Malabar Church Konthuruthy
 Kochi Port Trust
 Kochi Naval Base
 Naval Airport, Kochi
 Headquarters of Kerala Urban Road Transport Corporation
 Cochin Harbour Terminus
 Kochi Gurudwara, Perumanoor - The only Gurudwara in the state
 S. D. Convent, Perumanoor and Konthuruthy
 Kerala Folklore Museum
 Queen of Vembnad, Backwater Boating Cruises
 St. Jude Shrine, Thevara
 Life Care Centre Hospital Maliyekal Road Thevara.
 JGT Living Spaces - Uparika Malika Luxury Apartments, Thevara

Notable residents
 Mar Varghese Payyappilly Palakkappilly - Venerable and founder of the congregation of the Sisters of the Destitute (S. D.)
 Mohanlal - Malayalam actor

 Prithviraj Sukumaran - Malayalam actor

References

External links 
 Cochin Shipyard official site
 S.H college official site
 St.Jude Shrine,Thevara

Neighbourhoods in Kochi